Yahşi Cazibe is a Turkish comedy series. Cazibe, an Azerbaijani immigrant, marries Kemal to become a Turkish citizen. "Ms. Gül" who deals with illegal marriages arranges this marriage which will last for 3 years according to the agreement. Kemal receives TL 15,000 from Cazibe. But Kemal has a girlfriend, Simge, who is the daughter of Kemal's boss. Kemal's boss does not know that Kemal and his daughter are in a relationship.  Simge thinks that Cazibe is Kemal's maid. However  Ejder is the foreign marriage detective and he is trying to find proof that Cazibe only married Kemal to become a Turkish Citizen.

Yahşi Cazibe was the most popular series in Turkey that is published by ATV. The final episode was aired in 16 June 2012.

The word "Yahşi" comes from Azerbaijani and means beautiful, good, nice. (in Turkish: güzel, iyi). "Cazibe" means seduction, charm.

Cast

References

External links
 

Turkish comedy television series
2010 Turkish television series debuts
ATV (Turkey) original programming
Television shows set in Istanbul
Television series produced in Istanbul
Television series set in the 2010s
Turkish television series endings